Petroleum, also known as crude oil, or simply oil, is a naturally occurring yellowish-black liquid mixture of mainly hydrocarbons, and is found in geological formations. The name petroleum covers both naturally occurring unprocessed crude oil and petroleum products that consist of refined crude oil. A fossil fuel, petroleum is formed when large quantities of dead organisms, mostly zooplankton and algae, are buried underneath sedimentary rock and subjected to both prolonged heat and pressure.

Petroleum is primarily recovered by oil drilling. Drilling is carried out after studies of structural geology, sedimentary basin analysis, and reservoir characterisation. Recent developments in technologies have also led to the exploitation of other unconventional reserves such as oil sands and oil shale. 

Once extracted, oil is refined and separated, most easily by distillation, into innumerable products for direct use or use in manufacturing. Products include fuels such as gasoline (petrol), diesel, kerosene and jet fuel; asphalt and lubricants; chemical reagents used to make plastics; solvents, textiles, refrigerants, paint, synthetic rubber, fertilizers, pesticides, pharmaceuticals, and thousands of others. Petroleum is used in manufacturing a vast variety of materials essential for modern life, and it is estimated that the world consumes about  each day. Petroleum production can be extremely profitable and was critical to global economic development in the 20th century, with some countries, so-called "oil states", gaining significant economic and international power because of their control of oil production.

Petroleum exploitation and use have had significant negative environmental and social consequences. Extraction, refining and burning of petroleum fuels all release large quantities of greenhouse gases, so petroleum is one of the major contributors to climate change. Other negative environmental effects include oil spills, and air and water pollution. Some of these effects have direct and indirect health consequences for humans. Oil has also been a source of conflict, leading to both state-led-wars and other conflicts.  Production of petroleum is estimated to reach peak oil before 2035 as global economies lower dependencies on petroleum as part of climate change mitigation and a transition towards renewable energy and electrification.

Etymology

The word petroleum comes from Medieval Latin  (literally 'rock oil'), which comes from Latin petra 'rock' (from Greek  ) and oleum 'oil' (from Greek  ).

The origin of the term stems from monasteries in southern Italy where it was in use by the end of the first millennium as an alternative for the older term "naphtha". After that, the term was used in numerous manuscripts and books, such as in the treatise De Natura Fossilium, published in 1546 by the German mineralogist Georg Bauer, also known as Georgius Agricola. After the advent of the oil industry, during the second half of the nineteenth century, the term became commonly known for the liquid form of hydrocarbons.

History

Early

Petroleum, in one form or another, has been used since ancient times. More than 4300 years ago, bitumen was mentioned when the Sumerians used it to make boats. Tablet of the legend of the birth of Sargon of Akkad mentioned a basket which was closed by straw and bitumen. More than 4000 years ago, according to Herodotus and Diodorus Siculus, asphalt was used in the construction of the walls and towers of Babylon; there were oil pits near Ardericca (near Babylon), and a pitch spring on Zacynthus. Great quantities of it were found on the banks of the river Issus, one of the tributaries of the Euphrates. Ancient Persian tablets indicate the medicinal and lighting uses of petroleum in the upper levels of their society.

The use of petroleum in ancient China dates back to more than 2000 years ago. The I Ching, one of the earliest Chinese writings, cites that oil in its raw state, without refining, was first discovered, extracted, and used in China in the first century BCE. In addition, the Chinese were the first to record the use of petroleum as fuel as early as the fourth century BCE. By 347 CE, oil was produced from bamboo-drilled wells in China.

Crude oil was often distilled by Persian chemists, with clear descriptions given in Arabic handbooks such as those of Muhammad ibn Zakarīya Rāzi (Rhazes). The streets of Baghdad were paved with tar, derived from petroleum that became accessible from natural fields in the region. In the 9th century, oil fields were exploited in the area around modern Baku, Azerbaijan. These fields were described by the Arab geographer Abu al-Hasan 'Alī al-Mas'ūdī in the 10th century, and by Marco Polo in the 13th century, who described the output of those wells as hundreds of shiploads. Arab and Persian chemists also distilled crude oil to produce flammable products for military purposes. Through Islamic Spain, distillation became available in Western Europe by the 12th century. It has also been present in Romania since the 13th century, being recorded as păcură.

The French General Louis-Joseph de Montcalm encountered Seneca using petroleum for ceremonial fires and as a healing lotion during a visit to Fort Duquesne in 1750.

Early British explorers to Myanmar documented a flourishing oil extraction industry based in Yenangyaung that, in 1795, had hundreds of hand-dug wells under production.

Pechelbronn (Pitch fountain) is said to be the first European site where petroleum has been explored and used. The still active Erdpechquelle, a spring where petroleum appears mixed with water has been used since 1498, notably for medical purposes. Oil sands have been mined since the 18th century.

In Wietze in lower Saxony, natural asphalt/bitumen has been explored since the 18th century. Both in Pechelbronn as in Wietze, the coal industry dominated the petroleum technologies.

Modern
Chemist James Young noticed a natural petroleum seepage in the Riddings colliery at Alfreton, Derbyshire from which he distilled a light thin oil suitable for use as lamp oil, at the same time obtaining a more viscous oil suitable for lubricating machinery. In 1848, Young set up a small business refining crude oil.

Young eventually succeeded, by distilling cannel coal at low heat, in creating a fluid resembling petroleum, which when treated in the same way as the seep oil gave similar products. Young found that by slow distillation he could obtain several useful liquids from it, one of which he named "paraffine oil" because at low temperatures it congealed into a substance resembling paraffin wax.

The production of these oils and solid paraffin wax from coal formed the subject of his patent dated 17 October 1850. In 1850 Young & Meldrum and Edward William Binney entered into partnership under the title of E.W. Binney & Co. at Bathgate in West Lothian and E. Meldrum & Co. at Glasgow; their works at Bathgate were completed in 1851 and became the first truly commercial oil-works in the world with the first modern oil refinery.

The world's first oil refinery was built in 1856 by Ignacy Łukasiewicz. His achievements also included the discovery of how to distill kerosene from seep oil, the invention of the modern kerosene lamp (1853), the introduction of the first modern street lamp in Europe (1853), and the construction of the world's first modern oil "mine" (1854). at Bóbrka, near Krosno (still operational as of 2020).

The demand for petroleum as a fuel for lighting in North America and around the world quickly grew. Edwin Drake's 1859 well near Titusville, Pennsylvania, is popularly considered the first modern well. Already 1858 Georg Christian Konrad Hunäus found a significant amount of petroleum while drilling for lignite 1858 in Wietze, Germany. Wietze later provided about 80% of German consumption in the Wilhelminian Era. The production stopped in 1963, but Wietze has hosted a Petroleum Museum since 1970.

Drake's well is probably singled out because it was drilled, not dug; because it used a steam engine; because there was a company associated with it; and because it touched off a major boom. However, there was considerable activity before Drake in various parts of the world in the mid-19th century. A group directed by Major Alexeyev of the Bakinskii Corps of Mining Engineers hand-drilled a well in the Baku region of Bibi-Heybat in 1846. There were engine-drilled wells in West Virginia in the same year as Drake's well. An early commercial well was hand dug in Poland in 1853, and another in nearby Romania in 1857. At around the same time the world's first, small, oil refinery was opened at Jasło in Poland, with a larger one opened at Ploiești in Romania shortly after. Romania is the first country in the world to have had its annual crude oil output officially recorded in international statistics: 275 tonnes for 1857.

The first commercial oil well in Canada became operational in 1858 at Oil Springs, Ontario (then Canada West). Businessman James Miller Williams dug several wells between 1855 and 1858 before discovering a rich reserve of oil four metres below ground. Williams extracted 1.5 million litres of crude oil by 1860, refining much of it into kerosene lamp oil. Williams's well became commercially viable a year before Drake's Pennsylvania operation and could be argued to be the first commercial oil well in North America. The discovery at Oil Springs touched off an oil boom which brought hundreds of speculators and workers to the area. Advances in drilling continued into 1862 when local driller Shaw reached a depth of 62 metres using the spring-pole drilling method. By the end of the 19th century the Russian Empire, particularly the Branobel company in Azerbaijan, had taken the lead in production.

Access to oil was and still is a major factor in several military conflicts of the twentieth century, including World War II, during which oil facilities were a major strategic asset and were extensively bombed. The German invasion of the Soviet Union included the goal to capture the Baku oilfields, as it would provide much-needed oil supplies for the German military which was suffering from blockades. Oil exploration in North America during the early 20th century later led to the US's becoming the leading producer by mid-century. As petroleum production in the US peaked during the 1960s, however, the United States was surpassed by Saudi Arabia and the Soviet Union.

In 1973, Saudi Arabia and other Arab nations imposed an oil embargo against the United States, United Kingdom, Japan and other Western nations which supported Israel in the Yom Kippur War of October 1973. The embargo caused an oil crisis. This was followed by the 1979 oil crisis, which was caused by a drop in oil production in the wake of the Iranian Revolution and caused oil prices to more than double. The two oil price shocks had many short- and long-term effects on global politics and the global economy.  In particular, they led to sustained reductions in demand as a result of substitution to other fuels (especially coal and nuclear) and improvements in energy efficiency, facilitated by government policies. High oil prices also induced investment in oil production by non-OPEC countries, including Prudhoe Bay in Alaska, the North Sea offshore fields of the United Kingdom and Norway, the Cantarell offshore field of Mexico, and oil sands in Canada.

Today, about 90 percent of vehicular fuel needs are met by oil. Petroleum also makes up 40 percent of total energy consumption in the United States, but is responsible for only 1 percent of electricity generation. Petroleum's worth as a portable, dense energy source powering the vast majority of vehicles and as the base of many industrial chemicals makes it one of the world's most important commodities.

The top three oil-producing countries are the United States, Russia, and Saudi Arabia. In 2018, due in part to developments in hydraulic fracturing and horizontal drilling, the United States became the world's largest producer.
About 80 percent of the world's readily accessible reserves are located in the Middle East, with 62.5 percent coming from the Arab 5: Saudi Arabia, United Arab Emirates, Iraq, Qatar and Kuwait. A large portion of the world's total oil exists as unconventional sources, such as bitumen in Athabasca oil sands and extra heavy oil in the Orinoco Belt. While significant volumes of oil are extracted from oil sands, particularly in Canada, logistical and technical hurdles remain, as oil extraction requires large amounts of heat and water, making its net energy content quite low relative to conventional crude oil. Thus, Canada's oil sands are not expected to provide more than a few million barrels per day in the foreseeable future.

Composition
Petroleum includes not only crude oil, but all liquid, gaseous and solid hydrocarbons. Under surface pressure and temperature conditions, lighter hydrocarbons methane, ethane, propane and butane exist as gases, while pentane and heavier hydrocarbons are in the form of liquids or solids. However, in an underground oil reservoir the proportions of gas, liquid, and solid depend on subsurface conditions and on the phase diagram of the petroleum mixture.

An oil well produces predominantly crude oil, with some natural gas dissolved in it. Because the pressure is lower at the surface than underground, some of the gas will come out of solution and be recovered (or burned) as associated gas or solution gas. A gas well produces predominantly natural gas. However, because the underground temperature is higher than at the surface, the gas may contain heavier hydrocarbons such as pentane, hexane, and heptane in the gaseous state. At surface conditions these will condense out of the gas to form "natural-gas condensate", often shortened to condensate. Condensate resembles gasoline in appearance and is similar in composition to some volatile light crude oils.

The proportion of light hydrocarbons in the petroleum mixture varies greatly among different oil fields, ranging from as much as 97 percent by weight in the lighter oils to as little as 50 percent in the heavier oils and bitumens.

The hydrocarbons in crude oil are mostly alkanes, cycloalkanes and various aromatic hydrocarbons, while the other organic compounds contain nitrogen, oxygen and sulfur, and trace amounts of metals such as iron, nickel, copper and vanadium. Many oil reservoirs contain live bacteria. The exact molecular composition of crude oil varies widely from formation to formation but the proportion of chemical elements varies over fairly narrow limits as follows:

Four different types of hydrocarbon molecules appear in crude oil. The relative percentage of each varies from oil to oil, determining the properties of each oil.

Crude oil varies greatly in appearance depending on its composition. It is usually black or dark brown (although it may be yellowish, reddish, or even greenish). In the reservoir it is usually found in association with natural gas, which being lighter forms a "gas cap" over the petroleum, and saline water which, being heavier than most forms of crude oil, generally sinks beneath it. Crude oil may also be found in a semi-solid form mixed with sand and water, as in the Athabasca oil sands in Canada, where it is usually referred to as crude bitumen. In Canada, bitumen is considered a sticky, black, tar-like form of crude oil which is so thick and heavy that it must be heated or diluted before it will flow. Venezuela also has large amounts of oil in the Orinoco oil sands, although the hydrocarbons trapped in them are more fluid than in Canada and are usually called extra heavy oil. These oil sands resources are called unconventional oil to distinguish them from oil which can be extracted using traditional oil well methods. Between them, Canada and Venezuela contain an estimated  of bitumen and extra-heavy oil, about twice the volume of the world's reserves of conventional oil.

Petroleum is used mostly, by volume, for refining into fuel oil and gasoline, both important primary energy sources. Eight-four percent by volume of the hydrocarbons present in petroleum is converted into energy-rich fuels (petroleum-based fuels), including gasoline, diesel, jet, heating, and other fuel oils, and liquefied petroleum gas. The lighter grades of crude oil produce the best yields of these products, but as the world's reserves of light and medium oil are depleted, oil refineries are increasingly having to process heavy oil and bitumen, and use more complex and expensive methods to produce the products required. Because heavier crude oils have too much carbon and not enough hydrogen, these processes generally involve removing carbon from or adding hydrogen to the molecules, and using fluid catalytic cracking to convert the longer, more complex molecules in the oil to the shorter, simpler ones in the fuels.

Due to its high energy density, easy transportability and relative abundance, oil has become the world's most important source of energy since the mid-1950s. Petroleum is also the raw material for many chemical products, including pharmaceuticals, solvents, fertilizers, pesticides, and plastics; the 16 percent not used for energy production is converted into these other materials. Petroleum is found in porous rock formations in the upper strata of some areas of the Earth's crust. There is also petroleum in oil sands (tar sands). Known oil reserves are typically estimated at 190 km3 (1.2 trillion (short scale) barrels) without oil sands, or 595 km3 (3.74 trillion barrels) with oil sands. More recent studies, however, put the number at around 50 years.

Chemistry

Petroleum is mainly a mixture of hydrocarbons, i.e. containing only carbon and hydrogen. The most common components are alkanes (paraffins), cycloalkanes (naphthenes), and aromatic hydrocarbons. They generally have from 5 to 40 carbon atoms per molecule, although trace amounts of shorter or longer molecules may be present in the mixture.

The alkanes from pentane (C5H12) to octane (C8H18) are refined into gasoline, the ones from nonane (C9H20) to hexadecane (C16H34) into diesel fuel, kerosene and jet fuel. Alkanes with more than 16 carbon atoms can be refined into fuel oil and lubricating oil. At the heavier end of the range, paraffin wax is an alkane with approximately 25 carbon atoms, while asphalt has 35 and up, although these are usually cracked by modern refineries into more valuable products. The shortest molecules, those with four or fewer carbon atoms, are in a gaseous state at room temperature. They are the petroleum gases. Depending on demand and the cost of recovery, these gases are either flared off, sold as liquefied petroleum gas under pressure, or used to power the refinery's own burners. During the winter, butane (C4H10), is blended into the gasoline pool at high rates, because its high vapour pressure assists with cold starts. Liquified under pressure slightly above atmospheric, it is best known for powering cigarette lighters, but it is also a main fuel source for many developing countries. Propane can be liquified under modest pressure, and is consumed for just about every application relying on petroleum for energy, from cooking to heating to transportation.

The aromatic hydrocarbons are unsaturated hydrocarbons which have one or more planar six-carbon rings called benzene rings, to which hydrogen atoms are attached with the formula CnH2n-6. They tend to burn with a sooty flame, and many have a sweet aroma. Some are carcinogenic.

These different molecules are separated by fractional distillation at an oil refinery to produce gasoline, jet fuel, kerosene, and other hydrocarbons. For example, 2,2,4-trimethylpentane (isooctane), widely used in gasoline, has a chemical formula of C8H18 and it reacts with oxygen exothermically:

2 (l) + 25 (g) → 16 (g) + 18 (g) (ΔH = −5.51 MJ/mol of octane)

The number of various molecules in an oil sample can be determined by laboratory analysis. The molecules are typically extracted in a solvent, then separated in a gas chromatograph, and finally determined with a suitable detector, such as a flame ionization detector or a mass spectrometer. Due to the large number of co-eluted hydrocarbons within oil, many cannot be resolved by traditional gas chromatography and typically appear as a hump in the chromatogram. This Unresolved Complex Mixture (UCM) of hydrocarbons is particularly apparent when analysing weathered oils and extracts from tissues of organisms exposed to oil. Some of the components of oil will mix with water: the water associated fraction of the oil.

Incomplete combustion of petroleum or gasoline results in production of toxic byproducts. Too little oxygen during combustion results in the formation of carbon monoxide. Due to the high temperatures and high pressures involved, exhaust gases from gasoline combustion in car engines usually include nitrogen oxides which are responsible for creation of photochemical smog.

Formation

Fossil petroleum 

Petroleum is a fossil fuel derived from ancient fossilized organic materials, such as zooplankton and algae. Vast amounts of these remains settled to sea or lake bottoms where they were covered in stagnant water (water with no dissolved oxygen) or sediments such as mud and silt faster than they could decompose aerobically. Approximately 1 m below this sediment, water oxygen concentration was low, below 0.1 mg/L, and anoxic conditions existed. Temperatures also remained constant.

As further layers settled to the sea or lake bed, intense heat and pressure built up in the lower regions. This process caused the organic matter to change, first into a waxy material known as kerogen, found in various oil shales around the world, and then with more heat into liquid and gaseous hydrocarbons via a process known as catagenesis. Formation of petroleum occurs from hydrocarbon pyrolysis in a variety of mainly endothermic reactions at high temperature or pressure, or both. These phases are described in detail below.

Anaerobic decay 
In the absence of plentiful oxygen, aerobic bacteria were prevented from decaying the organic matter after it was buried under a layer of sediment or water. However, anaerobic bacteria were able to reduce sulfates and nitrates among the matter to H2S and N2 respectively by using the matter as a source for other reactants. Due to such anaerobic bacteria, at first this matter began to break apart mostly via hydrolysis: polysaccharides and proteins were hydrolyzed to simple sugars and amino acids respectively. These were further anaerobically oxidized at an accelerated rate by the enzymes of the bacteria: e.g., amino acids went through oxidative deamination to imino acids, which in turn reacted further to ammonia and α-keto acids. Monosaccharides in turn ultimately decayed to CO2 and methane. The anaerobic decay products of amino acids, monosaccharides, phenols and aldehydes combined to fulvic acids. Fats and waxes were not extensively hydrolyzed under these mild conditions.

Kerogen formation 
Some phenolic compounds produced from previous reactions worked as bactericides and the actinomycetales order of bacteria  also produced antibiotic compounds (e.g., streptomycin). Thus the action of anaerobic bacteria ceased at about 10 m below the water or sediment. The mixture at this depth contained fulvic acids, unreacted and partially reacted fats and waxes, slightly modified lignin, resins and other hydrocarbons. As more layers of organic matter settled to the sea or lake bed, intense heat and pressure built up in the lower regions. As a consequence, compounds of this mixture began to combine in poorly understood ways to kerogen. Combination happened in a similar fashion as phenol and formaldehyde molecules react to urea-formaldehyde resins, but kerogen formation occurred in a more complex manner due to a bigger variety of reactants. The total process of kerogen formation from the beginning of anaerobic decay is called diagenesis, a word that means a transformation of materials by dissolution and recombination of their constituents.

Transformation of kerogen into fossil fuels 
Kerogen formation continued to the depth of about 1 km from the Earth's surface where temperatures may reach around 50 °C. Kerogen formation represents a halfway point between organic matter and fossil fuels: kerogen can be exposed to oxygen, oxidize and thus be lost, or it could be buried deeper inside the Earth's crust and be subjected to conditions which allow it to slowly transform into fossil fuels like petroleum. The latter happened through catagenesis in which the reactions were mostly radical rearrangements of kerogen. These reactions took thousands to millions of years and no external reactants were involved. Due to radical nature of these reactions, kerogen reacted towards two classes of products: those with low H/C ratio (anthracene or products similar to it) and those with high H/C ratio (methane or products similar to it); i.e., carbon-rich or hydrogen-rich products. Because catagenesis was closed off from external reactants, the resulting composition of the fuel mixture was dependent on the composition of the kerogen via reaction stoichiometry. Three types of kerogen exist: type I (algal), II (liptinic) and III (humic), which were formed mainly from algae, plankton and woody plants (this term includes trees, shrubs and lianas) respectively.

Catagenesis was pyrolytic despite the fact that it happened at relatively low temperatures (when compared to commercial pyrolysis plants) of 60 to several hundred °C. Pyrolysis was possible because of the long reaction times involved. Heat for catagenesis came from the decomposition of radioactive materials of the crust, especially 40K, 232Th, 235U and 238U. The heat varied with geothermal gradient and was typically 10-30 °C per km of depth from the Earth's surface. Unusual magma intrusions, however, could have created greater localized heating.

Oil window (temperature range) 
Geologists often refer to the temperature range in which oil forms as an "oil window". Below the minimum temperature oil remains trapped in the form of kerogen. Above the maximum temperature the oil is converted to natural gas through the process of thermal cracking. Sometimes, oil formed at extreme depths may migrate and become trapped at a much shallower level. The Athabasca Oil Sands are one example of this.

Abiogenic petroleum 

An alternative mechanism to the one described above was proposed by Russian scientists in the mid-1850s, the hypothesis of abiogenic petroleum origin (petroleum formed by inorganic means), but this is contradicted by geological and geochemical evidence. Abiogenic sources of oil have been found, but never in commercially profitable amounts. "The controversy isn't over whether abiogenic oil reserves exist," said Larry Nation of the American Association of Petroleum Geologists. "The controversy is over how much they contribute to Earth's overall reserves and how much time and effort geologists should devote to seeking them out."

Reservoirs

Three conditions must be present for oil reservoirs to form:
 a source rock rich in hydrocarbon material buried deeply enough for subterranean heat to cook it into oil,
 a porous and permeable reservoir rock where it can accumulate,
 a caprock (seal) or other mechanism to prevent the oil from escaping to the surface. Within these reservoirs, fluids will typically organize themselves like a three-layer cake with a layer of water below the oil layer and a layer of gas above it, although the different layers vary in size between reservoirs. Because most hydrocarbons are less dense than rock or water, they often migrate upward through adjacent rock layers until either reaching the surface or becoming trapped within porous rocks (known as reservoirs) by impermeable rocks above. However, the process is influenced by underground water flows, causing oil to migrate hundreds of kilometres horizontally or even short distances downward before becoming trapped in a reservoir. When hydrocarbons are concentrated in a trap, an oil field forms, from which the liquid can be extracted by drilling and pumping.

The reactions that produce oil and natural gas are often modeled as first order breakdown reactions, where hydrocarbons are broken down to oil and natural gas by a set of parallel reactions, and oil eventually breaks down to natural gas by another set of reactions. The latter set is regularly used in petrochemical plants and oil refineries.

Petroleum has mostly been recovered by oil drilling (natural petroleum springs are rare). Drilling is carried out after studies of structural geology (at the reservoir scale), sedimentary basin analysis, and reservoir characterisation (mainly in terms of the porosity and permeability of geologic reservoir structures). Recent improvements to technologies have also led to exploitation of other unconventional reserves such as oil sands and oil shale. Wells are drilled into oil reservoirs to extract the crude oil. "Natural lift" production methods that rely on the natural reservoir pressure to force the oil to the surface are usually sufficient for a while after reservoirs are first tapped. In some reservoirs, such as in the Middle East, the natural pressure is sufficient over a long time. The natural pressure in most reservoirs, however, eventually dissipates. Then the oil must be extracted using "artificial lift" means. Over time, these "primary" methods become less effective and "secondary" production methods may be used. A common secondary method is "waterflood" or injection of water into the reservoir to increase pressure and force the oil to the drilled shaft or "wellbore." Eventually "tertiary" or "enhanced" oil recovery methods may be used to increase the oil's flow characteristics by injecting steam, carbon dioxide and other gases or chemicals into the reservoir. In the United States, primary production methods account for less than 40 percent of the oil produced on a daily basis, secondary methods account for about half, and tertiary recovery the remaining 10 percent. Extracting oil (or "bitumen") from oil/tar sand and oil shale deposits requires mining the sand or shale and heating it in a vessel or retort, or using "in-situ" methods of injecting heated liquids into the deposit and then pumping the liquid back out saturated with oil.

Unconventional oil reservoirs

Oil-eating bacteria biodegrade oil that has escaped to the surface. Oil sands are reservoirs of partially biodegraded oil still in the process of escaping and being biodegraded, but they contain so much migrating oil that, although most of it has escaped, vast amounts are still present—more than can be found in conventional oil reservoirs. The lighter fractions of the crude oil are destroyed first, resulting in reservoirs containing an extremely heavy form of crude oil, called crude bitumen in Canada, or extra-heavy crude oil in Venezuela. These two countries have the world's largest deposits of oil sands.

On the other hand, oil shales are source rocks that have not been exposed to heat or pressure long enough to convert their trapped hydrocarbons into crude oil. Technically speaking, oil shales are not always shales and do not contain oil, but are fined-grain sedimentary rocks containing an insoluble organic solid called kerogen. The kerogen in the rock can be converted into crude oil using heat and pressure to simulate natural processes. The method has been known for centuries and was patented in 1694 under British Crown Patent No. 330 covering, "A way to extract and make great quantities of pitch, tar, and oil out of a sort of stone." Although oil shales are found in many countries, the United States has the world's largest deposits.

Classification

The petroleum industry generally classifies crude oil by the geographic location it is produced in (e.g., West Texas Intermediate, Brent, or Oman), its API gravity (an oil industry measure of density), and its sulfur content. Crude oil may be considered light if it has low density, heavy if it has high density, or medium if it has a density between that of light and heavy. Additionally, it may be referred to as sweet if it contains relatively little sulfur or sour if it contains substantial amounts of sulfur.

The geographic location is important because it affects transportation costs to the refinery. Light crude oil is more desirable than heavy oil since it produces a higher yield of gasoline, while sweet oil commands a higher price than sour oil because it has fewer environmental problems and requires less refining to meet sulfur standards imposed on fuels in consuming countries. Each crude oil has unique molecular characteristics which are revealed by the use of Crude oil assay analysis in petroleum laboratories.

Barrels from an area in which the crude oil's molecular characteristics have been determined and the oil has been classified are used as pricing references throughout the world. Some of the common reference crudes are:
 West Texas Intermediate (WTI), a very high-quality, sweet, light oil delivered at Cushing, Oklahoma for North American oil
 Brent Blend, consisting of 15 oils from fields in the Brent and Ninian systems in the East Shetland Basin of the North Sea. The oil is landed at Sullom Voe terminal in Shetland. Oil production from Europe, Africa and Middle Eastern oil flowing West tends to be priced off this oil, which forms a benchmark
 Dubai-Oman, used as benchmark for Middle East sour crude oil flowing to the Asia-Pacific region
 Tapis (from Malaysia, used as a reference for light Far East oil)
 Minas (from Indonesia, used as a reference for heavy Far East oil)
 The OPEC Reference Basket, a weighted average of oil blends from various OPEC (The Organization of the Petroleum Exporting Countries) countries
 Midway Sunset Heavy, by which heavy oil in California is priced
 Western Canadian Select the benchmark crude oil for emerging heavy, high TAN (acidic) crudes.

There are declining amounts of these benchmark oils being produced each year, so other oils are more commonly what is actually delivered. While the reference price may be for West Texas Intermediate delivered at Cushing, the actual oil being traded may be a discounted Canadian heavy oil—Western Canadian Select—delivered at Hardisty, Alberta, and for a Brent Blend delivered at Shetland, it may be a discounted Russian Export Blend delivered at the port of Primorsk.

Once extracted, oil is refined and separated, most easily by distillation, into numerous products for direct use or use in manufacturing, such as petrol (gasoline), diesel and kerosene to asphalt and chemical reagents (ethylene, propylene, butene, acrylic acid,  para-xylene) used to make plastics, pesticides and pharmaceuticals.

Industry

Transport

In the 1950s, shipping costs made up 33 percent of the price of oil transported from the Persian Gulf to the United States, but due to the development of supertankers in the 1970s, the cost of shipping dropped to only 5 percent of the price of Persian oil in the US. Due to the increase of the value of the crude oil during the last 30 years, the share of the shipping cost on the final cost of the delivered commodity was less than 3% in 2010.

Price

Trade 
Crude oil is traded as a future on the Nymex exchange. Futures contracts are agreements in which buyers and sellers agree to purchase and deliver specific amounts of physical crude oil on a given date in the future. Each contract covers 1000 barrels and can be purchased up to nine years into the future. Below are the contract specifications for crude oil:

Uses

The chemical structure of petroleum is heterogeneous, composed of hydrocarbon chains of different lengths. Because of this, petroleum may be taken to oil refineries and the hydrocarbon chemicals separated by distillation and treated by other chemical processes, to be used for a variety of purposes. The total cost per plant is about 9 billion dollars.

Fuels
The most common distillation fractions of petroleum are fuels. Fuels include (by increasing boiling temperature range):

Petroleum classification according to chemical composition.

Other derivatives
Certain types of resultant hydrocarbons may be mixed with other non-hydrocarbons, to create other end products
 Alkenes (olefins), which can be manufactured into plastics or other compounds
 Lubricants (produces light machine oils, motor oils, and greases, adding viscosity stabilizers as required)
 Wax, used in the packaging of frozen foods, among others
 Sulfur or sulfuric acid. These are useful industrial materials. Sulfuric acid is usually prepared as the acid precursor oleum, a byproduct of sulfur removal from fuels.
 Bulk tar
 Asphalt
 Petroleum coke, used in speciality carbon products or as solid fuel
 Paraffin wax, derived from petroleum oil.
 Aromatic petrochemicals to be used as precursors in other chemical production

Use by country

Consumption statistics

Consumption
According to the US Energy Information Administration (EIA) estimate for 2017, the world consumes 98.8 million barrels of oil each day.

This table orders the amount of petroleum consumed in 2011 in thousand barrels (1000 bbl) per day and in thousand cubic metres (1000 m3) per day:

Source: US Energy Information Administration

Population Data:

1 peak production of oil already passed in this state

2 This country is not a major oil producer

Production

In petroleum industry parlance, production refers to the quantity of crude extracted from reserves, not the literal creation of the product.

Exportation

In order of net exports in 2011, 2009 and 2006 in thousand bbl/d and thousand m3/d:

Source: US Energy Information Administration

1 peak production already passed in this state

2 Canadian statistics are complicated by the fact it is both an importer and exporter of crude oil, and refines large amounts of oil for the U.S. market. It is the leading source of U.S. imports of oil and products, averaging  in August 2007.

Importation

In order of net imports in 2011, 2009 and 2006 in thousand bbl/d and thousand m3/d:

Source: US Energy Information Administration

Non-producing consumers
Countries whose oil production is 10% or less of their consumption.

Source: CIA World Factbook

Environmental effects

Climate change
, about a quarter of annual global greenhouse gas emissions is the carbon dioxide from burning petroleum (plus methane leaks from the industry). Along with the burning of coal, petroleum combustion is the largest contributor to the increase in atmospheric CO2. Atmospheric CO2 has risen over the last 150 years to current levels of over 415 ppmv, from the 180–300 ppmv of the prior 800 thousand years.
Ocean acidification is the increase in the acidity of the Earth's oceans caused by the uptake of carbon dioxide from the atmosphere.The saturation state of calcium carbonate decreases with the uptake of carbon dioxide in the ocean.  This increase in acidity inhibits all marine life—having a greater impact on smaller organisms as well as shelled organisms (see scallops).

Extraction
Oil extraction is simply the removal of oil from the reservoir (oil pool). There are many methods on extracting the oil from the reservoirs for example; mechanical shaking,  water-in-oil emulsion, and specialty chemicals called demulsifiers that separate the oil from water. Oil extraction is costly and often environmentally damaging. Offshore exploration and extraction of oil disturb the surrounding marine environment.

Oil spills

Crude oil and refined fuel spills from tanker ship accidents have damaged natural ecosystems and human livelihoods in Alaska, the Gulf of Mexico, the Galápagos Islands, France and many other places.

The quantity of oil spilled during accidents has ranged from a few hundred tons to several hundred thousand tons (e.g., Deepwater Horizon oil spill, SS Atlantic Empress, Amoco Cadiz). Smaller spills have already proven to have a great impact on ecosystems, such as the Exxon Valdez oil spill.

Oil spills at sea are generally much more damaging than those on land, since they can spread for hundreds of nautical miles in a thin oil slick which can cover beaches with a thin coating of oil. This can kill sea birds, mammals, shellfish and other organisms it coats. Oil spills on land are more readily containable if a makeshift earth dam can be rapidly bulldozed around the spill site before most of the oil escapes, and land animals can avoid the oil more easily.

Control of oil spills is difficult, requires ad hoc methods, and often a large amount of manpower. The dropping of bombs and incendiary devices from aircraft on the  wreck produced poor results; modern techniques would include pumping the oil from the wreck, like in the Prestige oil spill or the Erika oil spill.

Though crude oil is predominantly composed of various hydrocarbons, certain nitrogen heterocyclic compounds, such as pyridine, picoline, and quinoline are reported as contaminants associated with crude oil, as well as facilities processing oil shale or coal, and have also been found at legacy wood treatment sites. These compounds have a very high water solubility, and thus tend to dissolve and move with water. Certain naturally occurring bacteria, such as Micrococcus, Arthrobacter, and Rhodococcus have been shown to degrade these contaminants.

Because petroleum is a naturally occurring substance, its presence in the environment need not be the result of human causes such as accidents and routine activities (seismic exploration, drilling, extraction, refining and combustion). Phenomena such as seeps and tar pits are examples of areas that petroleum affects without man's involvement.

Tarballs
A tarball is a blob of crude oil (not to be confused with tar, which is a man-made product derived from pine trees or refined from petroleum) which has been weathered after floating in the ocean. Tarballs are an aquatic pollutant in most environments, although they can occur naturally, for example in the Santa Barbara Channel of California or in the Gulf of Mexico off Texas. Their concentration and features have been used to assess the extent of oil spills. Their composition can be used to identify their sources of origin, and tarballs themselves may be dispersed over long distances by deep sea currents. They are slowly decomposed by bacteria, including Chromobacterium violaceum, Cladosporium resinae, Bacillus submarinus, Micrococcus varians, Pseudomonas aeruginosa, Candida marina and Saccharomyces estuari.

Whales

James S. Robbins has argued that the advent of petroleum-refined kerosene saved some species of great whales from extinction by providing an inexpensive substitute for whale oil, thus eliminating the economic imperative for open-boat whaling, but others say that fossil fuels increased whaling with most whales being killed in the 20th century.

Alternatives
In 2018 road transport used 49% of petroleum, aviation 8%, and uses other than energy 17%. Electric vehicles are the main alternative for road transport and biojet for aviation. Single-use plastics have a high carbon footprint and may pollute the sea, but as of 2022 the best alternatives are unclear.

International relations 

Control of petroleum production has been a significant driver of international relations during much of the 20th and 21st centuries. Organizations like OPEC have played an outsized role in international politics. Some historians and commentators have called this the "Age of Oil" With the rise of renewable energy and addressing climate change some commentators expect a realignment of international power away from petrostates.

Corruption 
"Oil rents" have been described as connected with corruption in political literature. A 2011 study suggested that increases in oil rents increased corruption in countries with heavy government involvement in the production of oil. The study found that increases in oil rents "significantly deteriorates political rights". The researchers noted oil exploitation gave politicians "an incentive to extend civil liberties but reduce political rights in the presence of oil windfalls to evade redistribution and conflict".

Conflict 

Petroleum production has been linked with conflict for many years, leading to thousands of deaths due to these wars/conflicts. Petroleum deposits are in hardly any countries around the world; mainly in Russia and some parts of the middle east. Conflicts may start when countries refuse to cut oil production in which other countries respond to such actions by increasing their production causing a trade war as experienced during the 2020 Russia–Saudi Arabia oil price war. Other conflicts start due to countries wanting petroleum resources or other reasons on oil resource territory experienced in the Iran–Iraq War.

OPEC

Future production

Consumption in the twentieth and twenty-first centuries has been abundantly pushed by automobile sector growth. The 1985–2003 oil glut even fueled the sales of low fuel economy vehicles in OECD countries. The 2008 economic crisis seems to have had some impact on the sales of such vehicles; still, in 2008 oil consumption showed a small increase.

In 2016 Goldman Sachs predicted lower demand for oil due to emerging economies concerns, especially China. The BRICS (Brasil, Russia, India, China, South Africa) countries might also kick in, as China briefly had the largest automobile market in December 2009. In the long term, uncertainties linger; the OPEC believes that the OECD countries will push low consumption policies at some point in the future; when that happens, it will definitely curb oil sales, and both OPEC and the Energy Information Administration (EIA) kept lowering their 2020 consumption estimates during the past five years. A detailed review of International Energy Agency oil projections have revealed that revisions of world oil production, price and investments have been motivated by a combination of demand and supply factors. All together, Non-OPEC conventional projections have been fairly stable the last 15 years, while downward revisions were mainly allocated to OPEC. Recent upward revisions are primarily a result of US tight oil.

Production will also face an increasingly complex situation; while OPEC countries still have large reserves at low production prices, newly found reservoirs often lead to higher prices; offshore giants such as Tupi, Guara and Tiber demand high investments and ever-increasing technological abilities. Subsalt reservoirs such as Tupi were unknown in the twentieth century, mainly because the industry was unable to probe them. Enhanced Oil Recovery (EOR) techniques (example: DaQing, China) will continue to play a major role in increasing the world's recoverable oil.

The expected availability of petroleum resources has always been around 35 years or even less since the start of the modern exploration. The oil constant, an insider pun in the German industry, refers to that effect.

A growing number of divestment campaigns from major funds pushed by newer generations who question the sustainability of petroleum may hinder the financing of future oil prospection and production.

Peak oil

Peak oil is a term applied to the projection that future petroleum production (whether for individual oil wells, entire oil fields, whole countries, or worldwide production) will eventually peak and then decline at a similar rate to the rate of increase before the peak as these reserves are exhausted. The peak of oil discoveries was in 1965, and oil production per year has surpassed oil discoveries every year since 1980. However, this does not mean that potential oil production has surpassed oil demand.

It is difficult to predict the oil peak in any given region, due to the lack of knowledge and/or transparency in accounting of global oil reserves. Based on available production data, proponents have previously predicted the peak for the world to be in years 1989, 1995, or 1995–2000. Some of these predictions date from before the recession of the early 1980s, and the consequent lowering in global consumption, the effect of which was to delay the date of any peak by several years. Just as the 1971 U.S. peak in oil production was only clearly recognized after the fact, a peak in world production will be difficult to discern until production clearly drops off.

In 2020, according to BP's Energy Outlook 2020, peak oil had been reached, due to the changing energy landscape coupled with the economic toll of the COVID-19 pandemic.

While there has been much focus historically on peak oil supply, focus is increasingly shifting to peak demand as more countries seek to transition to renewable energy. The GeGaLo index of geopolitical gains and losses assesses how the geopolitical position of 156 countries may change if the world fully transitions to renewable energy resources. Former oil exporters are expected to lose power, while the positions of former oil importers and countries rich in renewable energy resources is expected to strengthen.

Unconventional oil 

Unconventional oil is petroleum produced or extracted using techniques other than the conventional methods. The calculus for peak oil has changed with the introduction of unconventional production methods. In particular, the combination of horizontal drilling and hydraulic fracturing has resulted in a significant increase in production from previously uneconomic plays. Analysts expected that $150 billion would be spent on further developing North American tight oil fields in 2015. The large increase in tight oil production is one of the reasons behind the price drop in late 2014. Certain rock strata contain hydrocarbons but have low permeability and are not thick from a vertical perspective. Conventional vertical wells would be unable to economically retrieve these hydrocarbons. Horizontal drilling, extending horizontally through the strata, permits the well to access a much greater volume of the strata. Hydraulic fracturing creates greater permeability and increases hydrocarbon flow to the wellbore.

Hydrocarbons on other worlds
On Saturn's largest moon, Titan, lakes of liquid hydrocarbons comprising methane, ethane, propane and other constituents, occur naturally. Data collected by the space probe Cassini–Huygens yield an estimate that the visible lakes and seas of Titan contain about 300 times the volume of Earth's proven oil reserves. Drilled samples from the surface of Mars taken in 2015 by the Curiosity rover's Mars Science Laboratory have found organic molecules of benzene and propane in 3-billion-year-old rock samples in Gale Crater.

In fiction

See also

 Barrel of oil equivalent
 Filling station
 Gas oil ratio
 List of oil exploration and production companies
 List of oil fields
 Manure-derived synthetic crude oil
 Oil burden
 Petroleum geology
 Petroleum politics
 Petrocurrency
 Thermal depolymerization
 Total petroleum hydrocarbon
 Waste oil
 Unconventional (oil & gas) reservoir

Citations

Explanatory footnotes

General and cited references 
 
  translated 1955
 
 
 
 
 
 
 Mirbabayev M.F.(2017).Brief history of the first drilled oil well;and the people involved.-"Oil-Industry History"(US),vol.18,#1, p. 25-34.

External links

 Global Fossil Infrastructure Tracker
 API – the trade association of the US oil industry. (American Petroleum Institute)
 U.S. Energy Information Administration
 U.S. Department of Energy EIA – World supply and consumption
 Joint Organisations Data Initiative | Oil and Gas Data Transparency
 U.S. National Library of Medicine: Hazardous Substances Databank – Crude Oil
 
"A Short History of Petroleum", Scientific American, 10 August 1878, p. 85

 
Causes of war
Chemical mixtures
Glassforming liquids and melts
Fossil fuels